The Australian Conservation Foundation (ACF) is Australia's national environmental organisation, launched in 1965 in response to a proposal by the World Wide Fund for Nature for a more co-ordinated approach to sustainability. 

One high-profile campaign was ‘Save the Whales’, which ended commercial whaling in Australia, following widespread protest against the huge slaughter. Another was to protect the vulnerable Great Barrier Reef by classifying it as a Marine Park, from which mining, drilling and trawling were banned. By 2000, ACF initiatives extended across a wide range of agendas, such as climate change, clean energy, rainforest preservation, greenhouse pollution and land tenure reform in the indigenous communities.
 
ACF is an independent, non-partisan, non-profit organisation focused on advocacy, policy, research and community organising, with a membership of 700,000. Its President, as of 2022, is Mara Bún.

Origins 
Discussions regarding the need for an Australian conservation organisation originated in the 1960s through HRH Prince Philip, Duke of Edinburgh, a founder of the World Wide Fund for Nature pivotal in establishment of the conservation movement in Australia. The head of the World Wide Fund, Philip Crowe, visited Australia in 1965 to advocate for more meaningful conservation action, recommending federal coordination, tax deductible donations for conservation and a national wildlife survey as three important measures. The Australian Conservation Foundation was established at a meeting of founders in Canberra, with the objective of supporting "conservation policies and schemes that need special encouragement by whatever methods are most appropriate," with funding obtained by public appeal for "material as well as moral support" to its work. Sir Garfield Berwick was elected as the foundation president and governance was by a member-elected council.

Campaigns and programs
The Australian Conservation Foundation campaigns on a wide range of environmental issues, including climate change, environmental law, clean energy, nuclear energy, economics, drivers of unsustainability, water management, and Indigenous land rights.
Campaigns and programs are selected predominantly for their capacity to contribute to reforms of national significance. This means that ACF tends not to become directly involved in local environmental issues, except where action on these contributes to achieving broader goals, such as highlighting examples of national problems or generating examples of solutions with larger potential. An example is the Stand up for Straddie campaign, which highlighted the effects of sand mining on Stradbroke Island. The organisation is acutely aware of its limited resources and strives to apply these strategically. This said, ACF is often called upon to comment on local issues and will often lend local environmental groups a helping hand. More often than not, ACF will work closely with other environmental groups – large or small – on the understanding that more can be achieved through co-operation. An example is ACF's collaboration with The Wilderness Society and others on the Places You Love campaign and role in the Stop Adani alliance.

In August 2007, ACF launched a new campaign – Who on Earth Cares – with Cate Blanchett as its ambassador, aiming to provide online community spaces for people to show they care about climate change in Australia, and who want to see Australia reduce its greenhouse pollution. ACF joined a number of other Australian conservation organisations to launch the Places You Love campaign ahead of the September 2013 Federal election. The organisations are all concerned with the Council of Australian Government's' proposals to wind back Australian environmental laws.

Successes

Ending commercial whaling in Australia 
ACF pressed the Federal Government to lead a campaign for a worldwide ban to whaling and for an end to whaling in Australian waters. Thirty thousand supporters responded to a television advertising campaign to 'Save the Whales'. In a 2004 speech to mark the 25-year anniversary of the end of this slaughter, former ACF president, Peter Garrett, described the ban on whaling – which came after examination of evidence from scientists and conservation groups that included the ACF and Project Jonah – as "a critical moment for...the many Australians who were beginning to attach a greater significance to the protection of our natural world".

Mining prevented in Antarctica 
ACF played a significant role in securing Antarctica's conservation and protection. In 1989 the Hawke Government implemented a treaty to ban mining in Antarctica indefinitely.

Wet Tropics gains World Heritage listing 
ACF campaigned for many years in the 1970s and 1980s to protect the Daintree Rainforests and achieve World Heritage status for the Wet Tropics area – a move that now protects around 900,000 hectares.

Koongarra gains World Heritage listing 
The Koongarra area within Kakadu National Park was inscribed onto the World Heritage List in June 2011. ACF, with traditional owner Jeffrey Lee, worked persistently for over 30 years to have this area recognised and protected from mining.

The formation of Landcare 
In 1989 ACF joined forces with the National Farmers' Federation (NFF) to launch Landcare – a grassroots movement dedicated to managing environmental issues in local communities across Australia. As of 2017, the Landcare movement is made up of more than 5,400 local groups across the nation.

Support for Cape York 
Since 1975, ACF has been supporting a land tenure reform process with the twin aims of delivering land justice to Indigenous traditional owners, and protecting high conservation value lands across the Cape York Peninsula. Since 1995 the Cape York land tenure resolution process has returned more than three million hectares of land to Aboriginal ownership. This includes more than two million hectares of Aboriginal owned and jointly managed national parks and more than a million hectares of Aboriginal freehold.

The Climate Reality Project 
The Climate Reality Project Australia, formed in 2006, ran in partnership with the Australian Conservation Foundation (ACF) until 2016. Since December 2016, it is hosted by the Melbourne Sustainability Society Institute. Founded by former US vice president Al Gore, the project has been successful in ensuring that one in 60 Australians have seen a presentation on the harmful effects of climate change and how they can work towards grassroots, worldwide solutions.

Protecting the Great Barrier Reef 
Since its formation, ACF has protected the reef from oil drilling, limestone mining, overfishing and trawling. In 1969, ACF kickstarted a Royal Commission which led to a ban on oil drilling on the reef. Six years later, after a national campaign by ACF and other community groups, the Australian government declared the Great Barrier Reef a national marine park. In the 1980s, the ACF community campaigned for the Reef's World Heritage listing – and won. In the early 2000s, one of ACF's greatest successes was in influencing the expansion of the Great Barrier Reef Marine Park. Over 3,500 submissions from ACF supporters to the Marine Park Authority saw environmentally protected areas of the reef increase from five per cent to one third of its expanse.

Jabiluka and Kakadu National Park 
ACF and other environment groups worked closely with the Mirarr people to halt the Jabiluka uranium mine at Kakadu and the 1998 blockade gained significant media attention and put Jabiluka on the national and international agenda. This campaign took a big step forward when the Mirarr people and mining company ERA signed an agreement that gives the Mirarr a veto on any future development at the stalled Jabiluka mine-site. ACF Executive Director Don Henry described the decision as "good news for Kakadu and a tribute to the power and persistence of the Mirarr and their many supporters".

Australian Business Roundtable on Climate Change 
The Australian Business Roundtable on Climate Change released a report, The Business Case For Early Action, which showed that significant reductions in greenhouse gas emissions can be achieved at an affordable cost to the Australian economy – an important step in getting business and government support. ACF led the development of the Roundtable in 2006 – which included CEOs from BP Australia, Insurance Australia Group, Origin Energy, Swiss Re, Visy Industries, Westpac and ACF. The Roundtable commissioned CSIRO and the Allen Consulting Group to determine climate impacts on Australia and model the economic effects of a 60% reduction in emissions by 2050 and supported the call to act, and act early, on the important issue of climate change. The Report highlighted the fact that many Australian industries, including two of the nation's largest export earners – agriculture and tourism – may be seriously impacted if action on climate change is delayed. Recommendations put forward by the Roundtable called for Australian Governments to work with business and the community to develop a policy framework that allows industry to respond effectively.

Creation of the Clean Energy Finance Corporation 
In December 2010 ACF released a report, Funding the transition to a clean energy economy, which assessed the tools used to support clean energy investment in other countries, and first put forward the blueprint for a $2 billion a year Clean Energy Finance Corporation. The $10 billion CEFC was accepted as part of the Clean Energy Future Package in July 2011, passing through parliament as law in June 2012.

People’s Climate March 2015 
In 2015, ACF led the People's Climate March in Melbourne, which kicked off global marches around the world. The rally brought out more than 60,000 people and was the biggest march in the world that weekend.

Recent campaigns

Stopping the Adani Carmichael coal mine

In November 2015, ACF filed a case to challenge the federal government's approval of Adani Mining's Carmichael coal mine ('Carmichael case') under the Environment Protection and Biodiversity Conservation Act ('EPBC Act). The purpose of the case was to highlight Australia's failed environmental laws, Australia's failure to act on climate change and to stop the Carmichael coal mine – a mine that would be the largest in the Southern Hemisphere. ACF argued that in making his decision, the Environment Minister did not correctly or fully consider the impact or likely impact of pollution on the Great Barrier Reef from the coal burnt in India.

The hearings were held in Brisbane's Federal Court on 3–4 May 2016 before Justice Griffiths. The Federal Court dismissed ACF's challenge on Monday 29 August 2016. On 3 March, ACF went back to court to appeal the decision stating that the government was using the "drug dealer’s defence". ACF is also a member of the StopAdani Alliance – a grassroots movement of local action groups working to build "the biggest environmental movement in Australia’s history" to stop Adani's mine.

Shifting to 100% clean energy

In April 2016, ACF published 'We love a sun-powered country', a vision document urging the Australian federal government to commit to a national Clean Energy Transformation Plan to shift Australia to 100% clean energy by 2050; transition Australia away from coal, oil and gas; and increase energy efficiency. In the same month, ACF launched a Clean Energy Leadership Forum with 17 prominent Australians from diverse sectors to develop a blueprint for a clean energy transformation. Members include former Governor-General Dame Quentin Bryce, AGL Energy CEO Mr Andrew Vesey and TV presenter Ms Indira Naidoo.

Members presented this evidence-based plan for transition to political decision makers in November 2016.

The blueprint details eight foundational actions that should form the basis of Australia's national plan to drive a clean energy transition:
 Update the electricity market to speed up a clean energy transition 
 Facilitate and accelerate the inevitable closure of coal plants
 Accelerate the uptake of clean energy and support the development of new technology
 Create an attractive sustainable investment environment for clean energy
 Ensure a just transition for communities and workers
 Protect vulnerable Australians 
 Make Australia's buildings and businesses much more efficient users of energy
 Dramatically reduce transport emissions 
Culture and conservation economy

ACF continues its efforts to promote a cultural and conservation economy for Northern Australia and to create economic opportunities for Indigenous communities through workshops and cultural and knowledge exchanges between government, the tourism industry and Indigenous communities in the Kimberley, Cape York and Kakadu.

Nuclear-free

ACF continues to campaign for a nuclear-free future, calling on governments to reduce radioactive risks by stopping uranium mining and export, withdrawing from the global nuclear industry and responsibly managing Australia's radioactive waste.

History

The 1960s
The ACF's founders were drawn from Australia's scientific, public service, business and political decision makers. A 1963 memo from the Duke of Edinburgh inspired Francis Ratcliffe to consult with his CSIRO colleagues, and work with conservationists and community leaders, to establish a national conservation body. Ratcliffe saw conservation as one of the three most important issues facing humanity, along with the avoidance of an atomic war and achieving racial harmony. In August 1964, at a conference in Canberra, the organisation that was to become the Australian Conservation Foundation was born. Its first president was Sir Garfield Barwick, then Chief Justice of the High Court. The ACF came into being as a legal entity when its certificate of incorporation was issued in August 1966.

Early meetings of the ACF Council identified the Mallee, rainforests, the Great Barrier Reef and central Australia as the areas most needing coordinated national attention and action. However, due to limited resources and the urgency of the threats to the Great Barrier Reef, the ACF focussed on protecting the Reef from mining and oil drilling. During the 1960s, the ACF developed most of the campaign methods it used for the following twenty-five years. They included research, policy development, education and lobbying. The ACF gave support to other conservation organisations and established local branches.

Ratcliffe had a vision of building a large body of members to support ACF financially and assist with community education. As the 1960s drew to a close, the wave of public support for conservation escalated.

The 1970s

The 1970s was the decade when the ACF consolidated its operations, extended its vision and committed to long-term plans for the achievement of conservation goals.

In 1970, the campaign to protect large areas of the Mallee in Victoria was resolved in favour of conservation. In 1972 the remote and beautiful Lake Pedder in Tasmania was flooded by a hydroelectric dam. A group of ACF members, angered by the organisation's failure to speak without fear or favour in opposition to the flooding of Lake Pedder, worked to bring about internal change. The ACF's approach to conservation campaigning became more strategic, active and independent and throughout the 1970s public awareness of conservation issues increased.

In 1973, Gough Whitlam, then Prime Minister of Australia, launched the first issue of Habitat, the ACF's magazine. Prince Philip, then president of the ACF, wrote that "Habitat will provide essential news on conservation matters to the public at large".

The ACF pressed the federal government to lead a campaign for a worldwide ban on whaling and for an end to whaling in Australian waters. Thirty thousand supporters responded to a television advertising campaign to "Save the Whales". Nine years of vigorous public campaigning later, a moratorium was declared on commercial whaling in 1981.

In 1974, Australia signed the World Heritage Convention and the ACF proposed World Heritage nominations for areas of great natural and cultural value, beginning with the Great Barrier Reef and Fraser Island.

Throughout the 1970s, ACF campaigned against uranium mining. The organisation was a principal party at the Ranger Uranium Environmental Inquiry (Fox Inquiry) into mining at Ranger in Kakadu, and pressed for the creation of a major national park to protect both the natural and cultural values of the area.

Inspired by its President, Dr Nugget Coombs, economist, environmentalist and Indigenous rights activist, the ACF moved to support Aboriginal land rights, and in 1978, pledged to work collaboratively with the Northern and Central Land Councils.

The ACF became increasingly involved in urban issues. ACF Councillor and unionist Jack Mundey was the force behind "green bans", that saw unions withdraw their labour from demolition sites to protect historic urban precincts like The Rocks in Sydney. Pollution, climate change and population growth became topics of debate in the pages of Habitat.

The 1980s
The explosive environmental issue of the early 1980s was the campaign to protect the Franklin River, one of the last wild rivers in Australia. ACF mobilised supporters and resources behind the campaign that went all the way to the High Court to prevent the damming of the river. A pervasive theme in the 1980s was the fight for Australia's native forests. In 1987, ACF and other environment groups pushed forests into the spotlight. Daintree's tropical rainforests finally gained World Heritage listing in 1988, despite the vehement opposition of the then Queensland Government. Kakadu's cultural and natural qualities were again under threat from uranium mining during the 1980s.

ACF played a lead role in securing Stages 1 and 2 of the Kakadu National Park and establishing an inquiry into the proposed Coronation Hill mine. The late 1980s saw ACF make a major effort to redress Australia's massive land degradation problems. In 1989 a historic alliance between ACF and the National Farmers Federation called for the establishment of a national Landcare program. Landcare provided a vision for the transformation to ecological sustainability that was embraced by all major political parties. The 1990s were to be declared 'The Decade of Landcare'.

One of the most important environment decisions in global terms was the Australian government's rejection of mining in Antarctica in 1989. A policy of protection for Antarctica had been developed by ACF in the mid-1970s and it was ACF's persistence with its vision and the success of its public awareness campaign that eventually convinced the government to act. In 1989 Peter Garrett, rock star and environmental activist, became President of ACF. Peter brought to the organisation his passion and commitment to a wide range of issues including anti-uranium, indigenous rights and Northern Australia.

Throughout the 1980s, ACF developed into an organisation that was more professional, more strategic in its alliances and more politically sophisticated. The decade closed with environmental issues high on the political agenda and ACF the leading national advocate for the environment.

The 1990s
In the 1990s ACF redefined its vision and sought to inspire a society that was environmentally aware and responsible. ACF positioned itself in the mainstream and by the end of the 1990s mainstream society had changed the way it viewed the environment. At the close of the millennium, progressive business came to understand environmental responsibility as a competitive advantage and more than sixty percent of Australians listed the environment as one of their major concerns.

The 1990s began on a high note. The environment was the focus of the federal election and ACF was swamped by the media with requests for information to produce environment-related TV programs, newspaper feature articles and radio documentaries. On World Environment Day 1990, ACF and Telecom Australia held a nationwide video conference for young people throughout the country to discuss ways to reduce ozone-depleting substances. Then in 1993 the recession hit and media attention turned away from the environment. Despite financial constraints, ACF continued to extend its influence through initiatives such as the Green Jobs Unit, which promoted employment creating environmental solutions; the alliance with the National Farmers Federation, which was renewed in 1996 and again in 2000; and the establishment of the GeneEthics Network to focus on the impact of genetic engineering.

ACF broadened its engagement with Indigenous peoples, both in Australia and in the Asia-Pacific region. The fight to stop mining at Coronation Hill succeeded in 1991 and from 1992 ACF was key in highlighting the environmental and social impacts of the Ok Tedi mine in Papua New Guinea.

The 1990s were the decade in which greenhouse pollution and climate change became critical issues. ACF helped to establish the Sustainable Energy Industries Council of Australia and the Federal government agreed to cut greenhouse gas emissions by 20% by the year 2005. When Canberra backtracked on this commitment in the mid-1990s, ACF spoke out in international forums including the 1995 Berlin Climate Change Conference.

In 1995 ACF launched its first website with a view to facilitating more frequent and effective communication with its diverse range of supporters. ACF worked to bring the degraded state of the Murray-Darling Basin to public attention. In 1996 ACF introduced the concept of environmental flows into the political arena and launched a major campaign to reverse the decline of Australia's rivers.

ACF and other environment groups worked with the Mirrar people to halt the Jabiluka uranium mine at Kakadu. The 1998 blockade gained significant media attention and placed Jabiluka on the national and international agenda.

21st century

In 2000 ACF's Natural Advantage: A Blueprint for a Sustainable Australia was launched by Sir William Deane, then Governor General of Australia. The blueprint outlined ACF's vision for a sustainable Australia and set out inspirational and long-term solutions to environmental problems. Some of the key initiatives of the blueprint were a national project of sustainability reform; a long-term, strategic commitment to land and water repair; greenhouse gas reductions and energy efficiency; environmental tax reform; reconciliation between Indigenous and non-Indigenous Australians; and building social capital to ensure all Australians benefit from their great natural advantages.

In the early years of the new millennium ACF 'walked the talk' and moved its head office to the 60L Green Building in Carlton. ACF's supporter base grew and many more Australians expressed a desire to make a difference for the environment. Polls regularly placed the environment among Australians' top concerns.

ACF has entered into a range of partnerships with Indigenous Australians, particularly in Northern Australia, with the scientific and business sector and with rural communities. ACF is developing a national community outreach program to inspire individual action on some of the most pressing environmental challenges Australians face. ACF's achievements for the decade of 2000–2010 include the restoration of flows to the Snowy River, the banning of radioactive waste dumps in SA, a halt to broadscale land clearing in Queensland, the promised rehabilitation of the Jabiluka mine site in Kakadu and the declaration of new Marine Parks in Victoria.

Funding

The Australian Conservation Foundation reported total revenue of $18,385,367.00in 2021.  Approximately 90 per cent of ACF's income is received through individual donations, bequests, memberships and grants. ACF disclosed $16.382 Million raised in 2021 from donations and bequests. Of the $13.1 Million in donations received by the ACF, $1.4 Million (11%) was spent on acquisition of donors "through external service providers".  They reported a net surplus of $3,263,972. Other sources of ACF income include rental income from the 60L Building and returns from ethical investments.

Organisation

The Australian Conservation Foundation is governed by a 21-member Council of Representatives elected every three years by the organisation's membership.[2] The Council meets regularly to determine organisational policy and priorities. ACF's democratic structure helps to ensure that its sixty-odd staff keep in touch with Australia's diverse grassroots environmental movement, while maintaining a high degree of professionalism and a strategic approach to sustainability issues of national significance. Council elects an Executive which meets more frequently to debate and decide on organisational matters in more detail. Council also appoints a voluntary President who represents ACF at a high level and who chairs Council meetings. In 2005 Professor Ian Lowe, distinguished Australian scientist and Emeritus Professor of Science, Technology and Society at Griffith University, was appointed President, replacing Peter Garrett. Professor Lowe served until June 2014. Don Henry was the CEO of the Australian Conservation Foundation from 1998 to 2014. The current CEO is Kelly O'Shanassy.

The governing body of the Foundation is the Board, which consists of the President, two Vice-Presidents, four Councillors and up to four co-opted members. Co-opted Board members are chosen on the basis of their skills and experience, thus ensuring an appropriate mix of skills and experience within the Board.

Magazine
 Habitat Australia  – A bi-annual magazine sent to ACF members going since 1973 – featuring our natural world, stories, ideas, and issues faced by the community.

References

Further reading
 Lines, William J. (2006) Patriots : defending Australia's natural heritage  St. Lucia, Qld. : University of Queensland Press, 2006.  
 Broadbent, Beverley (1999) Inside the Greening : 25 years of the Australian Conservation Foundation Insite Press, Elwood, Victoria, 1999.

External links

Australian Conservation Foundation Facebook page

Nature conservation organisations based in Australia
Non-profit organisations based in Australia
Organisations based in Melbourne
1966 establishments in Australia